Robert Burnaby Park is a 48 hectare public park in East Burnaby, just south of Burnaby Lake, located off Edmonds and 4th Street in British Columbia, Canada. It is open all year around from dawn to dusk. It has an extensive trail system, as well as tennis courts and a swimming pool in the cleared upper slope area. The north end of the park contains the Robert Burnaby Park Disc Golf Course, one of only a handful in Metro Vancouver. It is a favourite picnic spot for many residents of Burnaby and New Westminster. Dogs are welcome in the park as long as they are on leash and are kept out of areas marked ecologically sensitive. There is also an off-leash zone for dogs in the northern part of the park. Propane barbeques as well as charcoal and open fire barbeques are allowed in the park. Hot ash can be disposed of in the ash pits within the park. 

Ramsay Creek winds its way through the park, similar to many streams originating on the southern sloping hillside of Burnaby Lake and flowing into it. 

The park is named for the colonial businessman Robert Burnaby, the founding father of Burnaby. It was created as a public works project during the Great Depression.

External links
Official site

References

Parks in Burnaby